Megaloxantha is a genus of beetles in the family Buprestidae, containing the following species:

 Megaloxantha bicolor (Fabricius, 1775)
 Megaloxantha concolor (Kurosawa, 1978)
 Megaloxantha daleni (van der Hoeven, 1838)
 Megaloxantha descarpentriesi (Kurosawa, 1978)
 Megaloxantha hemixantha (Snellen van Vollenhoven, 1864)
 Megaloxantha kiyoshii (Endo, 1995)
 Megaloxantha mouhotii (Saunders, 1869)
 Megaloxantha netscheri (Lansberge, 1879)
 Megaloxantha purpurascens (Ritsema, 1879)

References

Buprestidae genera